The Heart of Stone Tour was the second solo concert tour by American singer-actress Cher. The tour supported her nineteenth studio album, Heart of Stone. A mini tour was set up in the summer 1989, and a second leg started in 1990. The tour reached North America, Australia and Europe and grossed over $40 million.

Background
The Heart of Stone Tour was Cher's most ambitious solo tour, after an 8-year absence, and spanned eight months, three continents plus two casinos, the Sands Hotel in Atlantic City and The Mirage in Las Vegas. It was, in Cher's own words, "a cross between Phantom of the Opera and Metallica". Her then-manager Bill Sammeth first set up a mini August tour in 1989, including stops in Detroit, Philadelphia, Chicago, Long Island, Providence, and Atlantic City. In eight shows, grosses of $200,000-plus per night were made before audiences of 8,000–11,500. After the filming of Mermaids, Cher resumed a bigger leg. The tour had been scheduled to open March 18 in Tucson, but the date was changed when the influenza threw Cher off her rehearsal schedule. Cher finally kicked off the North American leg of the tour in Dallas on March 31, 1990. The tour ran through to August 1990, and then proceeded to Europe and Australia in October and November.

Cher sang in eight shows, during a six-night engagement, at the 1,500-seat theatre of The Mirage.

Reception

The New York Times wrote of Heart of Stone Tour, "Her show is a kind of Las Vegas mystery play with a message: Trust yourself, don't give up on life or love, and eternal celebrity can be yours."

Set list
 "I'm No Angel"
 "Hold On"
 "We All Sleep Alone"
 "Bang-Bang"
 "I Found Someone"
 "Perfection"
 "Tougher Than the Rest"
 "After All"
 "If I Could Turn Back Time"

Encore
 "Many Rivers to Cross"
 "Heart of Stone"
 "Takin' It to the Streets"

Tour dates

Additional notes
Prior to the opening concert of the Australian leg of her concert in Adelaide on November 14, Cher also performed the after race concert at the conclusion of the 1990 Australian Formula One Grand Prix on November 4. The concert was held on the Christian Brothers College Oval in the middle of the Adelaide Street Circuit and a ticket to the race granted free entry to the show.

Cancellations:
Cher had to cancel her tour in Russia, two days after the tickets were sold. She was rumored to cancel dates in Brazil and Argentina as well.

Personnel
Show Directed by Kenny Ortega
Artistic Director: Marty Callner
Musical Director: Gary Scott
Set Designer: Kenny Ortega
Costume Design: Bob Mackie
Additional Costumes: Ret Turner
Additional Costumes: Mike Schmidt
Make-up: Leonard Engelman
Hair: Renate Leuschner
Keyboards: Paul Mirkovich
Guitar: Elijah Blue Allman
Guitar: Dave Amato
Guitar: David Shelley
Bass: Hugh McDonald
Bass: Donnie Nossov
Drums: Ron Wikso
Lead Vocals: Cher
Backing Vocalist: Darlene Love
Backing Vocalist: Pattie Darcy Jones
Backing Vocalist: Edna Wright
Dancers: Bubba Carr
Dancers: Aaron Cash
Dancers: Bill Holden Jr.
Dancers: Trish Ramish
Dancers: Michelle Rudy
Dancers: Peter Tramm
Dancers: Eyan Williams
Dancers: Troy Burgess

Broadcasts and recordings

Only a few dates during this tour were recorded and kept. The shows that we know were definitely recorded are:

Pensacola Civic Center, Pensacola, Florida, USA
Cher's 1990 Pensacola, Florida date was one of the concerts recorded as told by Cher herself on the 2005 release of the Mirage Special. During this concert, Cher's microphone does not work during the opening. There is no known copy of this concert in circulation and the only footage available is on the Mirage concert DVD. It is under the title of blooper in the bonus features and features only the concert intro and snippet of 'I'm No Angel'.

In 2020, TimeLife released “The Best Of Cher” on DVD.  A bonus feature included “Baby Hold On” and “Tougher Than The Rest” as recorded in Pensacola.  

Mirage Hotel & Casino, Las Vegas, Nevada, USA
Cher's two concerts at the Mirage Hotel & Casino in Las Vegas, Nevada were filmed as part of Cher's CBS special to be shown on television. These shows saw some of Cher's more conservative alternatives to her mainstream tour outfits, somewhat more suitable for a TV audience. Cher's outfit for 'If I Could Turn Back Time' is notably different as is Cher's opening outfit which seems more formal interpretation of the original. The stage shape was also altered for these shows, with runways forming two audience pits which joined at the centre.
The TV Special was aired February 4, 1991."

Jones Beach Amphitheater, Wantagh, New York, USA
This concert was filmed to be used in part with the 'Prime Time Live' Cher Tour special. The show featured interviews with Cher and backstage rehearsal footage. The program then cut live to the concert where 'If I Could Turn Back Time' was performed. There are copies in circulation of this uncut concert but nothing commercial.  It is reasonably difficult to obtain a copy other than from fan trades etc.  The show features fewer songs than Cher's Mirage Special, but does include the original tour outfits.

Melbourne Tennis Center, Melbourne, Australia
This concert was broadcast live via satellite to Australia's Sky Channel members.  The concert was shown in its entirety and uncut form, only once on television.  Little is known about this show other than it features extra performances of Desperado and Love Hurts.

Dallas, Texas, USA
Footage from this concert was shown during the April 3, 1990 episode of Entertainment Tonight. They labelled the tour as "Cher Tour 1990" and the Dallas show as opening night.  The show also showed backstage rehearsals the night before the opening.

Other Recordings
Other shows that haven't been identified were recorded on the tour which were used primarily for promotional use on programs such as Entertainment Tonight and Prime Time Live.  The same footage shown on Prime Time Live has also been included as bonus features for some of the songs on the Mirage DVD release.  The tour footage of the bonus songs on the Mirage DVD shows a different backing singer to any other footage.

Rehearsal footage
During the promotion of the tour, many television programs such as Entertainment Tonight went backstage showing the construction and rehearsal of the set.  There is a fair amount of rehearsal footage considering the little amount of the tour that was filmed.Rehearsal footage is available as a second angle option in the 2005 release of her Mirage concert.  The show was filmed on Cher's personal video camera in front of a small non-paying audience.  The show at this stage is only in its development stages and the footage is used by Cher as a "work tape" for her to see where she can improve.
During certain songs such as "I Found Someone" and "Takin' It to the Streets" in the original VHS and DVD releases, shots of Cher rehearsing for her Mirage shows were shown in black and white. Due to the fact the shots were shown over the concert, the original audio is not available although it does show Cher rehearsing her dance moves for the end track.In 1990 Prime Time Live did a special about Cher's upcoming tour. As well as showing clips from the tour and a satellite performance from the concert that night, footage of Cher rehearsing was also shown. It's not clear which show she was actually in sound check for, but during the rehearsal she requested the overall level of the band to be reduced.Footage from the Dallas, Texas rehearsals was shown with an Entertainment Tonight report on Cher's tour. It showed Cher practising her dance steps for her closing number and also miscues during the runthrough.
The US TV show After Hours also showed rehearsal footage of songs such as "After All", "Hold On" and "I'll Be There For You" during an interview promoting the tour.  The shots were possibly taken for her Atlantic City show as Cher mentions that that is where she is when being interview although this is not certain.

References

Cher concert tours
1989 concert tours
1990 concert tours